Pine Point may refer to:

Australia
Pine Point, South Australia, a small township south of Ardrossan.

Canada
Pine Point, Northwest Territories, a former mining town
Pine Point Mine
Pine Point Park, a park in Toronto, Ontario

United States
Pine Point, Minnesota, United States, a census-designated place
Pine Point Township, Becker County, Minnesota
Pine Point Research Natural Area in Minnesota
Pine Point (California), a landform on Richardson Bay in Marin County, California